Gabriel Monnier (born 10 May 1977) is a French former competitive figure skater. He is the 2002 French national champion and won four senior international medals. He reached the free skate at four ISU Championships, achieving his best result, 10th, at the 2002 Europeans in Lausanne.

Personal life 
Monnier was born 10 May 1977 in Paris. He studied at Rognoni College in Paris and at the National Institute of Sport and Physical Education (INSEP). He earned a Bachelor of Science in 1995. He continued his studies in biology at the Pierre and Marie Curie University in Paris, earning a degree in 1999 and a BA.

Career 
Monnier began skating at the age of five and became serious about it when he was nine. One of his favorite skaters was Petr Barna for his precision and style.

In November 1991, Monnier placed 16th at the 1992 World Junior Championships in Hull, Quebec. The following season, making his senior international debut, he placed 13th at the Grand Prix International St. Gervais. He competed on both senior and junior levels for several years, winning the silver medal at the 1994 International St. Gervais (senior), gold at the 1994 Blue Swords (junior), bronze at the 1995 Ondrej Nepela Memorial (senior), and silver at the 1995 Blue Swords (junior). His final junior appearance came in November–December 1995 at the 1996 World Junior Championships in Brisbane, Australia; he placed 6th in his qualifying group, 11th in the short program, 17th in the free skate, and 14th overall.

Monnier appeared at three ISU Champions Series/Grand Prix events – the 1997 Skate America (11th), 2000 Skate Canada International (12th), and 2000 Trophée Lalique (7th). He placed 15th (8th in his qualifying group, 15th in the next two segments) at his first senior ISU Championship – the 2000 Europeans in Vienna, Austria. In his final competitive season, 2001–02, he won the French national title and placed 10th at the 2002 Europeans in Lausanne (5th in his qualifying group, 11th in the short, 9th in the free skate).

Monnier retired from competitive skating in 2002 and began skating in ice shows, including Holiday on Ice, both in France and abroad. In 2008, he led the club Dijon while resuming his studies. In February 2009, he was elected as a team leader of the France team for the figure skating world junior championships in Sofia. He is also a technical specialist.

Programs

Results 
GP: Champions Series/Grand Prix

References

External links 
 Official site
 

1977 births
Living people
French male single skaters
Figure skaters from Paris
Competitors at the 1997 Winter Universiade
Competitors at the 1999 Winter Universiade
Competitors at the 2001 Winter Universiade